Zoe Perry (born September 26, 1983) is an American actress. She has appeared as the young Mary Cooper in the CBS sitcom Young Sheldon, a role originated by her mother Laurie Metcalf in the show's predecessor The Big Bang Theory, and in recurring roles on The Family and Scandal.

Early life and career 
Perry was born in Chicago to actors Laurie Metcalf and Jeff Perry. Her first television roles were two appearances as Jackie Harris (as seen in flashback) on the ABC sitcom Roseanne, the character portrayed by her mother. Her parents, however, did not want her to pursue acting until she became an adult, fearing the effect of stress. Perry said that she was too shy to act in high school, but began performing at Northwestern University, as a way to make friends after transferring from Boston University.

After graduating, Perry moved to New York to search for television work, landing small roles on series such as Law & Order: Criminal Intent, but homesickness brought her back to California, where she found theater work. In 2013, she performed in The Other Place on Broadway alongside her mother. In 2015, she performed alongside her father and Kevin McKidd in Eugene O'Neill's Pulitzer Prize-winning drama Anna Christie at the Odyssey Theatre Ensemble in West Los Angeles.

Perry appeared in nine episodes of the ABC thriller The Family in 2016. In 2017, she had a recurring role on the ABC political thriller Scandal, starring her father. The same year, she was cast as a younger version of Mary Cooper (Sheldon Cooper's mother) on Young Sheldon, a spin-off of the CBS sitcom The Big Bang Theory. Despite her family link to the character, she received the role through an audition.

Filmography

Film

Television

Theater

References

External links
 
 Zoe Perry on CBS.com

1983 births
20th-century American actresses
21st-century American actresses
Actresses from Chicago
American child actresses
American film actresses
American stage actresses
American television actresses
Boston University alumni
Living people
Northwestern University alumni